The Pablo Neruda Ibero-American Poetry Award is an annual award granted by the National Council of Culture and the Arts (CNCA) of Chile, through the .

It is granted annually "to an author who has a distinguished career and whose work is a notable addition to the cultural and artistic dialogue of Ibero-America."

In 2012, for the first time, its prose counterpart was presented: the Manuel Rojas Ibero-American Narrative Award, in honor of the author of Hijo de ladrón, which on that occasion was won by the Brazilian Rubem Fonseca.

Winners

Books presented
 was compiled and published especially for the occasion of Parra receiving the award in 2012.

See also

 Pablo Neruda Award, granted by the Neruda Foundation to poets under 40
 Pablo Neruda Order of Artistic and Cultural Merit, also granted by the CNCA

References

2004 establishments in Chile
Awards established in 2004
Chilean literary awards
Poetry awards
Pablo Neruda
Ibero-American awards